Maple (Maple Automobile Co., Ltd.) (Chinese: 枫叶) is a Chinese automobile manufacturing company based in Fengjing, Shanghai, and a subsidiary of Zhejiang Geely Holding Group.

History
Originally Shanghai Maple (SMA, Shanghai Maple Automobiles), the brand was established in 2000 producing Huapu (Maple) branded vehicles. Geely acquired a strategic holding in Shanghai Maple in 2002, and in 2008 Shanghai Maple was fully consolidated into Geely as their budget brand before phasing it out in 2010.

The first Shanghai Maple vehicle was produced in the summer of 2003, based on the 1990s-era Citroen ZX.

The Maple Marindo was displayed at the 2005 Frankfurt Motor Show.

The export of Shanghai Maple vehicles to Egypt began in 2007, where were marketed as the C51 (saloon) and C52 (saloon with Audi style grille). A sportier R80 hatchback and R81 saloon were exported to markets including Russia and Chile. In 2010 Geely partially phased-out the Shanghai Maple marque,  replacing it with the Englon budget brand.

In February 2013, Shanghai Maple and Kandi Technologies announced that they had agreed to establish a 50:50 joint venture, Zhejiang Kandi Electric Vehicles Investment, with an initial registered capital of 1 billion yuan (US$160 million), focused on the research and development, production, marketing and sale of electric vehicles in the Chinese mainland. The joint venture agreement was signed on 22 March 2013.

As of 2020, the Maple brand was revived as a result of a partnership between Geely and Kandi Technologies. Geely holds 78 per cent of Fengsheng Automotive Technology Group, the remaining 22 per cent is owned by Zhejiang Kandi Vehicle or Kandi Technologies. The business purpose is officially stated as research, development, and sales of electric vehicles and vehicle parts, vehicle leasing services, and relevant after-sales services. The revived Maple brand will make a series of affordable electric cars based on existing Geely petrol cars. The first Maple product is the Maple 30X, based on the Geely Vision X3. According to the Maple product launch plan, a mid-size SUV, a mini hatchback and an ultra-mini hatchback are planned for 2021. The Chinese manufacturer also announced that an electric pickup and an electric roadster is in the pipeline.

In March 2021, Kandi Technologies exited its stake, transferring its 22% equity interest in Fengsheng to Geely.

In 2022, Geely launched the joint venture between Lifan and Maple called Livan (Ruilan, 睿蓝). Geely announced the launch of the Maple Leaf 60S , Geely’s first battery swap car under the Livan brand, produced in association with Lifan and based on the Geely Emgrand GL. 

During the Livan brand launched later in June 2022, a brand new model, the Livan 7 electric fastback crossover was teased, while a few days later at the 2022 Chongqing Auto Show, the Livan 9 electric mid-size crossover SUV was shown for the first time being developed based on the Geely Haoyue.

Current products 
 2020– Maple 30X — 5-door Electric subcompact crossover SUV
 2020– Maple 80V — 5-door Electric MPV
 2021– Maple 60S — 4-door Electric compact sedan

2022– Livan 9 — 5-door Electric mid-size crossover SUV
2022– Livan 7 — 5-door Electric fastback compact crossover SUV

Previous products
 2008–2010 Maple Haiyue (海悦) — 5-door hatchback
 2003–2010 Maple Hisoon (海迅) — 4-door sedan & 5-door hatchback
 2005–2010 Maple Haiyu (海域) — 4-door sedan & 5-door hatchback
 2005–2010 Maple Hysoul (海尚) — 4-door sedan
 2003–2010 Maple Hisoon (海炫) — 5-door hatchback
 2004–2010 Maple Marindo/Haifeng (海锋) — 1.8 L 4-door sedan
 2009–2010 Maple Haijing (海景) — 4-door sedan

References

Car manufacturers of China
Vehicle manufacturing companies established in 2000
Geely brands